

Indian Super League, I-League 
The clubs playing in Indian Super League or I-League also participate in the top tier league of the state, Calcutta Premier Division.

ATK Mohun Bagan
East Bengal
Mohammedan

Calcutta Premier Division

:
 Aryan
 Bhawanipore
 BSS
 Calcutta Customs
 Eastern Railway
 Food Corporation of India (East Zone)
 George Telegraph
 Kalighat Milan Sangha
 Kidderpore
 Pathachakra
 Peerless
 Police AC
 Railways FC
 Rainbow
 Southern Samity
 Tollygunge Agragami
 United
 West Bengal Police

CFL 1st Division
:

 Aikya Sammilani
 Anushilani Club
 Barisha SC
 Bengal Nagpur Railway
 Calcutta FC 
 Calcutta Police Club
 Calcutta Port Trust
 Chandney SC
 Dalhousie
 Howrah Union
 Measurers Club
 Milan Bithee
 Mouri SC
 MD AC
 Salkia Friends
 SAI (EZ)
 Sreebhumi FC
 SAIL
 Suburban Club
 Taltala Ekata Sangha
 City AC
 United Students
 Wari
 Youngs Corner
 Diamond Harbour FC

CFL 2nd Division
:

 Coal India FC
 Jorabagan Club
 Kalighat Sports Lovers Association
 New Alipore Suruchi Sangha
 North Entally UTS
 Rajasthan Club
 Ramkrishna SC
 Taltala Institute
 The Muslim Institute
 Town Club
 Janbazar AC
 Uttarpally MS
 Young Bengal SA

CFL 3rd Division
:

 Adamas United Sports Academy
 Albert SC
 Alipore SC
 Bally Protiva Club
 Batore SC
 Behala Youth Association
 Calcutta Gymkhana
 Cossipore Saraswati Club
 Garalgacha SC
 Greer SC
 Howrah Maniktala SA
 Kalighat Club
 Kumartuli Institute
 M. Milan Samity
 Sonali Shibir AC
 Southern AC
 Tangra FC
 Victoria SC
 West Bengal United Club
 Y.M.S.A

CFL 4th Division
:

 Bata SC
 Behala ASA
 Beleghata AC
 Burnpur United Club
 Central Calcutta SC
 Chaitaly Sangha
 Dakshin Kalikata Sansad
 Elysium Club
 International Club
 Jadavpur Agragami
 JEFA Jadavpur Association
 Kalighat FDS Club
 Kasba Central Club
 Moitri Sangha
 Paikpara SC
 Shyamnagar United Club
 Sinthee Rasbehari ABM
 Sporting Union
 Uttarpara SC
 White Border Club
 YMCA (Coll)

CFL 5th Division
:

 Armenian SC
 Arunoday Club
 Aurora AA
 Ballygunge Institute
 Bani Niketan SC
 Bagmari Club
 Beleghata BB
 Beleghata Friends Union
 Bengal SC
 Beniatola Club
 Beniapukur Institute
 Buddhist Club
 Calcutta AC
 Calcutta Parsee Club
 Calcutta Rangers Club
 Calcutta United Club
 COGS
 Darjeepara MS
 Evergreen Club
 Excelsiors Club
 Federation Club
 Garden Reach AC
 Garden Reach MS
 Goan Association of Bengal
 Hastings FC
 Howrah Town Club
 Hrishikesh Park Institute
 India Club
 IB AC
 Jugasanti SC
 Kalighat Milani Club
 Karbala SC
 Kolkata Union SC
 Marcus SC
 Mei-Kong Ex Std
 Milan Chakra
 Mirzapur Union
 Mitra Sammilani
 National AC
 National SC
 N. Sir Gurudas Institute
 Nivedita Club
 Old Friends Union
 P. Utkal Club
 Punjab SC
 Rakhi Sangha
 RHAC
 Sarat Samity
 Saroda Charan AC
 Shibpur Institute
 Baranagar Shibsankar SC
 Shyambazar Club
 South Folk Club
 Star SC
 Subhasdwip SC
 Tapan Memorial Club
 Tara Friends Club
 The Orient Club
 West Bengal Association of the Deaf
 YMCA (Chow)
 YMCA (Well)

See also
 List of football clubs in Kolkata

Note
 Clubs playing in higher divisions are not included in the lower divisions

References

External links
IFA Clubs
Kolkata Football

Football clubs in West Bengal